Canadian Ringette Championships,, sometimes abbreviated CRC, is Canada's annual premiere national ringette tournament for the best ringette players and teams in the country. It encompasses three age/class divisions: Under-16 (U16), Under-19 (U19) and the seasonal championship for Canada's National Ringette League (NRL). The competition is usually held in the month of April. The first CRC was held in Winnipeg, Manitoba in 1979. The National Ringette League playoffs are the knockout match, round robin and tournament for determining the champion for National Ringette League.

The next tournament, the 2023 Canadian Ringette Championships, is a 7-day event which will take place in Regina, Saskatchewan, from April 9-15th, 2023. National champions will be decided in U16, U19 and National Ringette League divisions.

The 2024 Canadian Ringette Championships will take place in Dieppe, New Brunswick, from April 7th – April 13th, 2024.

Overview 
The event is organized by Canada's national sporting organization for the sport of ringette called Ringette Canada. It should not be confused with the Canada Winter Games which is a separate national multi-sport event, though ringette is a part of the Canada Winter Games program.

The tournament serves two main important functions. The first is to organize several competitions for the best ringette teams from each of the different Canadian provinces from various competitive levels and determine the national ringette champions of Canada for the season. The second is to organize the final elite competition between qualifying teams from Canada's National Ringette League, (the highest level of the sport in Canada) and determine which elite ringette team is the best in Canada overall. The tournament also serves as ground for those scouting for Canadian ringette talent, especially for those in the National Ringette League and those scouting for talent for both the junior and senior Canadian national ringette teams.

Divisions
There are three classes in this championship:

 U16 AA (Under 16 AA)

 U19 AA (Under 19 AA)

 National Ringette League (Semi-professional/showcase league)

Awards

Sportsmanship
The Agnes Jacks True Sport Award for sportsmanship is given in each of the three divisions at the end of the championships.

U16 AA
The Ringette Canada Trophy is awarded to the Canadian U16 AA champions.

U19 AA
The Sam Jacks Memorial Trophy is awarded to the Canadian U19 AA champions in memory of Sam Jacks. It was first awarded to the winning team at the Canadian Ringette Championships in Winnipeg, Manitoba in 1979 and was donated by the city of North Bay, Ontario, the birthplace of ringette. It should not be confused with the Sam Jacks Trophy which is awarded to the world senior champions at the World Ringette Championships.

National Ringette League

The Jeanne Sauvé Memorial Cup is awarded to the National Ringette League champions in memory of the late Governor General of Canada. In December 1984, the trophy was first initiated as the Jeanne Sauvé Cup, then was first presented at the 1985 Canadian Ringette Championships in Dollard des Ormeaux, Québec. The Jeanne Sauvé Cup was established in 1985 by the then President of Ringette Canada, Betty Shields. After Sauvé's death in 1993, it was renamed the Jeanne Sauvé Memorial Cup.

History 

The first championship was held in Winnipeg, Manitoba in 1979. The elite National Ringette League (NRL) champions compete annually at the Canadian Ringette Championships at the end of the NRL season, an event which first began in 2004.

Champions

1979 to 1992

1993 to 2000

2001 to 2019

2020 to present

See also 
 2018 Canadian Ringette Championships

References

Ringette
 
Ringette competitions
National Ringette League